The men's 400 metres hurdles event at the 2014 Asian Games was held at the Incheon Asiad Main Stadium, Incheon, South Korea on 30 September – 1 October.

Schedule
All times are Korea Standard Time (UTC+09:00)

Records

Results
Legend
DSQ — Disqualified

Round 1
 Qualification: First 2 in each heat (Q) and the next 2 fastest (q) advance to the final.

Heat 1

Heat 2

Heat 3

Final

References

Results

Hurdles 400 men
2014 men